Wollombi was an electoral district for the Legislative Assembly in the Australian state of New South Wales. It was created in 1859, named after and including the town of Wollombi, however the district extended to the coast including the towns of Gosford and Norah. The southern border was the Hawkesbury River while the northern border was Lake Macquarie and Dora Creek. It was abolished in 1894 and absorbed into Northumberland.

Members for Wollombi

Election results

References

Former electoral districts of New South Wales
Constituencies established in 1859
1859 establishments in Australia
Constituencies disestablished in 1894
1894 disestablishments in Australia